Jean-Pierre Danthine  (born May 16, 1950 in Havelange, Belgium) is a Swiss-Belgian economist and deputy chairman of the Swiss National Bank from 2012 to 2015. He has published numerous articles and books.

Biography
Danthine studied economics at the Catholic University of Leuven in Belgium and earned his PhD in 1976 at Carnegie Mellon University. He then researched and lectured at various universities, including Columbia University, University of Southern California, the University of Laval in Québec and the Aix-Marseille University in France. From 1980 to 2009, Danthine was  professor of  macroeconomics and financial economics at HEC Lausanne.

From 1996 to 2005 he was managing director of the International Center for Financial Asset Management and Engineering (FAME) in Geneva. In 2006 he took over the management of the newly founded Swiss Finance Institute until 2009. He was research fellow at the Centre for Economic Policy Research (CEPR) in London. Danthine was elected at the beginning of 2010 as a member of the board of the Swiss National Bank. In 2012 he was appointed vice president of the board.

Publications
European Labour Markets : A Long-run View, Charles R. Bean, Peter Bernholz, Jean-Pierre Danthine, Edmond Malinvaud. CEPR, 1990, ISBN 92 - 9079-110-1
The Future of European Banking, Jean-Pierre Danthine, Francesco Giavazzi, Xavier Vives, Ernst-Ludwig Von Thadden. CEPR, 1999, 
Emu and Portfolio Adjustment, Jean-Pierre Danthine. CEPR, 2001, 
Intermediate Financial Theory, Jean-Pierre Danthine and John B. Donaldson. Prentice-Hall, 2001, 
Intermediate Financial Theory, Jean-Pierre Danthine and John B. Donaldson. Elsevier Academic Press, 2nd Edition 2005,

References

External links 
 Biography at the Faculty of Economic Sciences HEC, University of Lausanne
 Biography at the Swiss National Bank

Central bankers
Financial economists
Macroeconomists
Swiss bankers
Swiss economists
Belgian economists
1950 births
Carnegie Mellon University alumni
Living people